The M-636 was a six-axle, 3,600 hp diesel locomotive marketed as part of the Montreal Locomotive Works six-axle "M-Line" series of locomotives. It was essentially the Canadian-built version of the ALCO Century 636, and it saw many sales to Canadian, Mexican and Australian customers. Today, there are a handful M-636s left in revenue service.

Original owners

See also 
 List of MLW diesel locomotives

References 

M-636
BHP Billiton diesel locomotives
C-C locomotives
Diesel locomotives of Western Australia
Railway locomotives introduced in 1969
Standard gauge locomotives of Australia
Standard gauge locomotives of the United States
Standard gauge locomotives of Canada
Diesel-electric locomotives of Australia